Frank Parlow (born 22 April 1967) is a German former yacht racer who competed in the 1992 Summer Olympics and in the 1996 Summer Olympics.

References

1967 births
Living people
German male sailors (sport)
Olympic sailors of Germany
Sailors at the 1992 Summer Olympics – Tornado
Sailors at the 1996 Summer Olympics – Tornado
Tornado class world champions
World champions in sailing for Germany